Mim is a city in the Asunafo North Municipal District in the Ahafo Region of Ghana. It is a nodal town between Sunyani and Goaso via the N12 Highway. The distance from Mim to Sunyani is 64 km whilst that of Mim to Goaso is 14 km.
Mim also has direct routes to: Kumasi; Accra; Kenyasi;Dormaa Ahenkro; Nkrankwanta and Sefwi Debiso.
Mim is known for producing timber, cocoa and cashew.
The estimated population of Mim in 2017 was 30,753 making it the largest town in Ahafo Region and that of Asunafo North Municipal District.

History 
AHAFO'' means hunters. The land which Ahafo people occupy today, originally belonged to the Aowin.

Abirimoro Akwojan, an Aowin Chief and his people were in control of Ahafo which was a forestland and almost uninhabited.Sometime in the eighteenth century, whilst Asantehene Opoku 
 Ware I was engaged in a war with the Akyem, the terrible news of
 Abirimoro's invasion of Kumasi reached him at the battlefield in
 Akyem. 

Opuku Ware instantly dispatched Akyempimhene, Owusu Afřiyie and
 Bantamahene Amankwa Tia to pursue Abirimoro & his  invaders. 
The Akyempimhene accepted the request but he deputed his younger brother,
 Hiahene Oheneba Sabin,  Nyinahinhene, Nkawie-paninhene and the
 Buaso Odikro to pursue Abirimoro and his people.

 In like manner, Amankwa
 Tia delegated the chief of Akwaboah - Brefo Apaw, Ofenano Barihene -
 Gyedu Kumanin, and Assuonwinhene - Kofi Akyena.

The chiefs of Akwaboa, Nkawie-panin,
 Nyinahin, Ofenano or Аmакуе Bari, Assuowin, Hiahene undertook the Abirimoro war and
 conquered AHAFO.The warriors chased Abirimoro and his forces across
the Tano and Bia rivers to as far as the bank of river Manza in what is
 now La Cote d'Ivoire. The war lasted three years.

Asantehene Opoku Ware I, presented the
 newly conquered territory to the Chiefs as a gift.Each of them was asked to
 take care of or control the area he had conquered.

The Chiefs settled people of Asante, Akyem and Denkyira backgrounds in Ahafo to perform various duties to the
 Asantehene and they the wing chiefs.
The most outstanding of these duties  was hunting.Hence the name Ahafo (hunters) given to the Area.

Akwaboah Chief & his warriors were gifted with the land they conquered.The Chief & his warriors founded Mim with all the lands of the present Acherensua, Kenyase, Hwidiem, Ayomso all under the control of Mim.Akwaboah, is an ancient town near Kumasi.

According to history, the warriors established their outpost in a section of the forest which was full of palm trees.They used the branches of the palm trees for shelter and referred to the area as 'Mem' or 'Mim' which is Twi word for palm trees. 

 Festival 
The People of Mim celebrate the Akwansramu Festival and this ceremony is usually held in December. Akwansramu is one of Ghana's many festivals that see attendance from people from all walks of life including the diaspora.

The Akwansramu is a staple of Ghana's colourful, vibrant and diverse cultural expression, bringing together people from all walks of life to celebrate themes of victory, harvest and gratitude in unity.

 Economy 
Mim can be described as an averagely dynamic center for farming, trading and industrial activities.Agriculture: The fundamental occupation of residents of Mim is farming, which is cultivation of cash crops and food crops. The predominant cash crops grown in this area are cocoa and cashew. Mim and its surrounding towns such as: Goaso, Bediako, Gambia No2, Kasapin & Bitre Ahenkro (Kwadwo Adaikrom) produce about a quarter of the foodstuffs that are sent to Accra and Tema.Industry:'''
The tropical forest reserves in this area serve as source of raw materials for the numerous timber companies in Mim. 
The Ayum Forest Products Limited formerly Mim Timbers, Mim Scanstyle Company Limited, Ocean-wood company limited, Supremo Wood processing co. Ltd amongst tens of timber firms located in Mim exist because of the abundance of timber in this area. However, the recent illegal chainsaw operations are fast depleting the forest reserves and are threatening the existence of these timber companies which provide hundreds of employment to the teeming population.

The cashew plantations in Mim area also provide constant source of raw materials for the Mim Cashew and Agricultural products Ltd which produces the 'Mim Cashew Brandy'.

Tourism 
One of the tourist sites in Mim is the Mim Bour or 'Mim mountains'.
These Rocky Mountains are famous tourist attraction center in the Ahafo Region of Ghana. According to history, the paramount chief of Mim used to climb the Mim bour whenever he wanted to address his people, and it is also said that, from the top, he could see all the areas within his jurisdiction and even as far as Techiman and Kumasi. 
From the top of the Mim Bour, you have a plain view of the cashew plantation and surrounding areas.

Mim Lake is another tourist attraction located off the Mim-Kenyasi road.
It's about 1 km away north of the Mim township. This is an artificial lake where tourists and local people visit for leisure, canoeing and site seeing.
This lake is also known as 'Anwomasu lake'.

Education 
Mim has several educational institutions including:
 Mim Senior High School
 Ghana Greentech Academy.

References

External links 
 
 

Populated places in the Ahafo Region